These 232 genera belong to Curculioninae, a subfamily of weevils in the family Curculionidae.

Curculioninae genera

 Acallopistellus Hustache, 1956 c g
 Acallopistus Schönherr, 1825 c g
 Acalyptops Hartman, 1904 c g
 Acalyptus Schönherr, 1833 i c g b
 Acentrus Desmarest, 1839 c g
 Achia Champion, 1903 c g
 Achynius Fairmaire, 1902 c g
 Adelus Schönherr, 1836 c g
 Adisius Fairmaire, 1903 c g
 Aetiomerus Pascoe, 1886 c g
 Afrogeochus Rheinheimer, 1998 c g
 Afrosmicronyx Hustache, 1935 g
 Alloprocas Broun, 1893 c g
 Amorphoidea Motschoulsky, 1858 c g
 Anarciarthrum Blackburn, 1890 c g
 Anchonocranus Marshall, 1912 c g
 Anchylorhynchus Schönherr, 1833 c g
 Ancylocnemis Marshall, 1920 c g
 Andranthobius Kuschel, 1952 g
 Aneuma Pascoe, 1876 c g
 Anoplus Germar, 1820 c g
 Anthonomopsis Dietz, 1891 i c g b
 Anthonomus Germar, 1817 i c g b
 Aporotaxus Perroud & Montrouzier, 1864 c g
 Arthriticosoma Lea, 1899 c g
 Assuanensius Pic, 1916 c g
 Atractomerus Duponchel & Chevrolat, 1849 c g b
 Aubeonymus Jacquelin du Val, 1855 c g
 Botanebius Schoenherr, 1835 c g
 Brachonyx Schönherr, 1825 c g
 Brachyogmus Linell, 1897 i c g b
 Bradybatus Germar, 1824 c g
 Buttikoferia Roelofs, 1892 c g
 Byrsodes Marshall, 1939 c g
 Cassythicola Lea, 1910 c g
 Celetes Schönherr, 1836 c g
 Celetotelus Broun, 1893 c g
 Ceratopus Schönherr, 1843 c g
 Chelonychus Dietz, 1891 i c g b
 Chelotonyx Waterhouse, 1853 c g
 Cionellus  c
 Cionesthes Fairmaire, 1902 c g
 Cionomimus Marshall, 1939 i c g b
 Cionopsis Champion, 1903 i c g b
 Cionus Clairville, 1798 i c g b
 Cisowhitea Lea, 1915 c g
 Cleopomiarus Pierce, 1919 c g b
 Cleopus Dejean, 1821 c g
 Coccotorus LeConte, 1876 i c g b
 Colabus Schönherr, 1843 c g
 Cotithene Voss, 1940 g
 Cranopoeus Marshall, 1931 c g
 Craspedotus Schönherr, 1844 c g
 Cratopechus Marshall, 1928 c g
 Cratoscelocis Lea, 1927 c g
 Cremastorhynchus Scudder, 1893 c g
 Cryptoplus Erichson, 1842 c g
 Cycloporopterus Lea, 1908 c g
 Cydmaea Pascoe, 1872 c g
 Derelomus Schönherr, 1825 i c g b
 Diapelmus Erichson, 1842 c g
 Dicomada Pascoe, 1873 c g
 Dietzianus Sleeper, 1953 i b
 Dyschoenium Blackburn, 1890 c g
 Ecnomorhinus Vanin, 1986 c g
 Elaeidobius Kuschel, 1952 b
 Electrotribus Hustache, 1942 g
 Elleschodes Blackburn, 1897 c g
 Ellescina  b
 Empira Pascoe, 1874 c g
 Emplesis Pascoe, 1870 c g
 Empolis Blackburn, 1890 c g
 Encosmia Blackburn, 1893 c g
 Eniopea Pascoe, 1873 c g
 Epacticus Blackburn, 1893 c g
 Epaetius Kuschel, 1952 c g
 Epamoebus Blackburn, 1893 c g
 Epembates Kuschel, 1952 c g
 Ephelops Dietz, 1891 i c g b
 Epimechus Dietz, 1891 i c g b
 Eristinus Lea, 1915 c g
 Erodiscus Schönherr, 1825 c g
 Erytenna Pascoe, 1870 c g
 Ethadomorpha Blackburn, 1901 c g
 Eudela Pascoe, 1885 c g
 Eudelodes Zimmerman, 1994 c g
 Euhackeria Lea, 1910 c g
 Euryscapoides Wibmer & O'Brien, 1986 g
 Euthebus Pascoe, 1870 c g
 Exotorrhamphus Voss, 1957 c g
 Geochus Broun, 1882 c g
 Geranorhinus Chevrolat, 1860 c g
 Gerynassa Pascoe, 1873 c g
 Glaucopela Pascoe, 1874 c g
 Griphosternus Heller, 1916 c g
 Gymnetron Schoenherr, 1825 i c g
 Hammatostylus Champion, 1903 c g
 Haplonyx Schoenherr, 1836 c g
 Hedychrous Marshall, 1923 c g
 Helaeniella Hustache, 1956 c g
 Huaca Clark, 1993 i c g b
 Hybomorphus Saunders & Jekel, 1855 c g
 Hybophorus Waterhouse, 1853 c g
 Hypoleschus Fall, 1907 i g b
 Hypotagea Pascoe, 1876 c g
 Hypsomus Schönherr, 1836 c g
 Imathia Pascoe, 1885 c g
 Ita Tournier, 1878 c g
 Ixamine Pascoe, 1870 c g
 Laemomerus Kirsch, 1874 c g
 Lancearius Vanin, 1986 c g
 Lepidoops Hustache, 1933 c g
 Leucomelacis Lea, 1928 c g
 Lexithia Pascoe, 1870 c g
 Lignyodina  b
 Lonchophorellus Clark, 1989 c g
 Loncophorus Chevrolat, 1832 c g
 Ludovix Laporte de Castelnau, 1840 c g
 Lybaeba Pascoe, 1873 c g
 Macrobrachonyx Pic, 1902 c g
 Macrorhoptus LeConte, 1876 i c g b
 Madecastyphlus Richard, 1979 c g
 Magdalinops Dietz, 1891 i c g b
 Malaiserhinus Kuschel, 1952 c g
 Mecinus Germar, 1821 i c g b
 Melanterius Erichson, 1842 c g
 Melexerus Burke, 1982 c g
 Menesinus Faust, 1898 c g
 Merocarterus Hustache, 1956 c g
 Miarus Schönherr, 1825 i c g
 Micraonychus Lea, 1915 c g
 Microberosiris Lea, 1907 c g
 Micromyrmex Sleeper, 1953 i c g b
 Microstylus Schönherr, 1847 c g
 Misophrice Pascoe, 1872 c g
 Misophricoides Rheinheimer, 1990 c g
 Myllorhinus Boisduval, 1835 c g
 Myrmex Sturm, 1826 i c g b
 Nanops Dietz, 1891 i c g b
 Narberdia Burke, 1976 i c g b
 Nedyleda Pascoe, 1872 c g
 Neoderelomus Hoffmann, 1938 g
 Neomastix Dietz, 1891 i c g b
 Neomelanterius Lea, 1899 c g
 Neomycta Pascoe, 1877 c g
 Neosharpia Hoffmann, 1956 c g
 Neosphinctocraerus Hustache, 1939 c g
 Nerthops Schoenherr, 1826 c g
 Niseida Pascoe, 1885 c g
 Nothofaginoides Kuschel, 1952 c g
 Nothofaginus Kuschel, 1952 c g
 Nothofagobius Kuschel, 1952 c g
 Notolomus LeConte, 1876 i g b
 Olanaea Pascoe, 1873 c g
 Olbiodorus Blackburn, 1893 c g
 Omogonus Chevrolat, 1878 c g
 Onychocnemis Marshall, 1917 c g
 Oopterinus Casey, 1892 i c g b
 Orichora Pascoe, 1870 c g
 Orthochaetes  c g
 Pachytrichus Schönherr, 1836 c g
 Pachytychius Jekel, 1861 i c g b
 Palontus Kuschel, 1990 c g
 Pansmicrus Schönherr, 1848 c g
 Paranerthops Hustache, 1920 c g
 Paranoplus Hustache, 1920 c g
 Paraphilernus Desbrochers, 1892 c g
 Parendoeopsis Hustache, 1920 c g
 Parimera Faust, 1896 c g
 Paroryx  c
 Paryzeta Pascoe, 1873 c g
 Patialus Pajni, Kumar & Rose, 1991 c g
 Perelleschus Wibmer & O'Brien, 1986 g
 Phacellopterus Schönherr, 1847 c g
 Phaeodica Pascoe, 1874 c g
 Phaunaeus Lea, 1910 c g
 Philernus Schoenherr, 1835 c g
 Phyllotrox Schönherr, 1843 i c g b
 Phytotribus Schönherr, 1843 c g
 Piazorhinus Schönherr, 1835 i c g b
 Pimelerodius Vanin, 1986 c g
 Placorrhinus Marshall, 1948 c g
 Plaesiorhinus Blackburn, 1893 c g
 Praolepra Broun, 1880 c g
 Prionobrachium Faust, 1894 c g
 Promecotarsus Casey, 1892 i c g b
 Prosicoderus Vanin, 1986 c g
 Pseudanthonomus Dietz, 1891 i c g b
 Pseuderodiscus Heller, 1932 c g
 Pseudodesmidophorus Hustache, 1920 c g
 Pseudopoophagus Voss, 1935 c g
 Pseudostoreus Lea, 1899 c g
 Pseudostyphlus Tournier, 1874 c g
 Ptinopsis Champion, 1906 c g
 Pyropus Schoenherr, 1836 c g
 Rhinidotasia Lea, 1928 c g
 Salsolia Bajtenov, 1978 c g
 Sharpia Tournier, 1873 c g
 Sicoderus Vanin, 1986 i c g b
 Sidomenia Laporte, 1840 c g
 Sigastus Pascoe, 1865 c g
 Simachus Broun, 1886 c g
 Smicraulax Pierce, 1908 i c g b
 Smicronyx Schönherr, 1843 i c g b
 Smicrorhynchus Scudder, 1893 c g
 Spanochelus Marshall, 1931 c g
 Sphincticraeropsis Voss, 1944 c g
 Sphincticraerus Marseul, 1871 g
 Stelechodes Faust, 1899 c g
 Stenotypus Marshall, 1957 c g
 Stereonychidius Morimoto, 1962 c g
 Stereonychus Suffrian, 1854 c g
 Storeus Schoenherr, 1843 c g
 Strabonus Kuschel, 2008 g
 Styphlidius Penecke, 1936 c g
 Styphlus Schönherr, 1826 c g
 Sucinostyphlus Kuska, 1996 c g
 Swezeyella Zimmerman, 1942 c g
 Symbothynus Blackburn, 1890 c g
 Synnadophila Voss, 1937 c g
 Teridates Champion, 1903 c g
 Terires Champion, 1902 c g
 Teutheria Pascoe, 1875 c g
 Thaumastophasis Wollaston, 1873 c g
 Themelia Blackburn, 1894 c g
 Topelatus Hustache, 1920 c g
 Tychiina Gistel, 1848 b
 Ulomascus Fairmaire, 1848 c g
 Usingerius Zimmerman, 1942 c g
 Wittmerius Kuschel, 1952 c g
 Zeopus Pascoe, 1872 c g

Data sources: i = ITIS, c = Catalogue of Life, g = GBIF, b = Bugguide.net

References

Curculionidae